Felicita Pauļuka (May 8, 1925 – December 8, 2014) was a Latvian painter mainly noted for her portraits, nudes, and book illustrations. She established Latvian pastel painting traditions in the second half of the 20th century and is known for her portrait and nude paintings in Latvian art.

Biography 
Pauļuka was born Felicita Jānke on May 8, 1925, in Riga, Latvia, to a family of German origin.

In 1940, Pauļuka enrolled in the Art Academy of Latvia as the youngest student at 15. After quitting her studies for four years, due to World War II, she resume her studies in 1944 and worked as an illustrator and cartoonist in the newspaper Cīņa. In 1949, she graduated with distinction from the portrait painting master workshop of the Art Academy of Latvia led by Ģederts Eliass and Leo Svemps. Her work towards a diploma included a monumental figural composition in oil titled Vecāķu Fishermen (1949). 

She participated in exhibitions starting in 1950, and in 1956 she became a member of the Artists Union of Latvia.

From 1943 to 1960, she was married to the Latvian painter Jānis Pauļuks, whom she met before World War II at the Art Academy of Latvia. They lived together for less than ten years until the beginning of the 1950s. She was also his muse and model. 

From 1961 to 1980, her spouse was the Ukrainian graphic artist Sergejs Adamovičs.

Art 
Pauļuka is one of the most prominent representatives of portrait and nude painting in Latvian art. She painted with oil and pastels, and drew expressive drawings in charcoal and sangina techniques. Her charcoal and sangina drawings are considered classic examples of Latvian art history.

In the 1950s and 1960s, she gained recognition in graphics and book art, creating a style in children's literature illustrations. Pauļuka also collaborated with the magazines Draugs and Zīlīte. 

In the 1960s, Pauļuka worked on a series of portraits of Latvian cultural workers. She also objectively interpreted the external forms, characters and peculiarities of popular artists, writers, and actors.

References 

1925 births 
2014 deaths
Latvian illustrators 
20th-century Latvian women artists
Latvian painters 
Latvian women painters